This is a list of real and fictional people with the surname Samaniego.

A
Adriano Samaniego, Paraguayan football striker
Agatha Samaniego, fictional character in the Philippine television series Juan Happy Love Story played by Filipino actress Kim Domingo

D
Daniel Torres Samaniego, Mexican competition swimmer
Danilo Samaniego, Ecuadorian football player
Diego González Samaniego, Roman Catholic prelate who served as Bishop of Mondoñedo

E
Enrique Samaniego, Paraguayan harpist and composer
Estanislao Struway Samaniego, former Paraguayan soccer midfielder

F
Félix María de Samaniego, Spanish neoclassical fabulist
Filoteo Samaniego, Ecuadorian novelist, poet, historian, translator, and diplomat

J
Jesús Adrián Rodríguez Samaniego, Mexican radio journalist
Jorge Samaniego, dancer and choreographer
José Antonio Manso de Velasco y Sánchez de Samaniego, Spanish soldier, 1st Count of Superunda, governor of Chile, and viceroy of Peru
Joseph Ruiz Samaniego, maestro de capilla at the Basilica of Our Lady of the Pillar in Zaragoza
José Ramón Gil Samaniego, Mexican actor best known as Ramón Novarro
Juan de Samaniego y Xaca, Spanish military officer and Governor of New Mexico

L
 Lilian Samaniego (born 1965), Paraguayan pharmaceutical chemist and politician

M
Marcial Samaniego López, Paraguayan general, author, and government official

R
Roberto Durán Samaniego, Panamanian professional boxer best known as Roberto Durán

S
Santiago Samaniego, professional boxer

See also
 
 

Spanish-language surnames
Lists of people by surname